Miroshnykov or Miroshnikov  is a surname of Ukrainian origin. It is a patronymic surname literally meaning "son of miller (miroshnyk)". Notable people with the surname include: 

Daniil Miroshnikov
Oleksandr Miroshnikov

See also
12214 Miroshnikov,  a minor planet

Ukrainian-language surnames
Patronymic surnames

ru:Мирошников